The 2020 season for the  road cycling team began in January at the Tour Down Under. Cofidis stepped up to the UCI WorldTeam status this season after spending the last 10 years as a UCI Professional Continental team.

Roster

Riders who joined the team for the 2020 season

Riders who left the team during or after the 2019 season

Season victories

National, Continental and World champions

References

External links

2020 road cycling season by team
Cofidis (cycling team)
2020 in French sport